The Liberal Democratic Center was a Greek political party founded in 1965 by former Centre Union members of parliament. The party was created to support the government of Stefanos Stefanopoulos after the Apostasia of 1965.

The party was dissolved after the fall of the government of Stefanos Stefanopoulos.

Well known members
Stefanos Stefanopoulos
Georgios Athanasiadis-Novas
Konstantinos Mitsotakis
Ilias Tsirimokos
Stavros Kostopoulos
Dimitrios Papaspyrou
and other former MPs of Centre Union

Liberal parties in Greece
Political parties established in 1965